The men's 100 metres at the 2018 European Athletics Championships took place at the Olympic Stadium on 6 and 7 August. Churandy Martina of the Netherlands was the defending champion, Jak Ali Harvey of Turkey was the defending silver medalist, and Jimmy Vicaut of France was the defending bronze medalist.

Records

Schedule

Competition format
The top eight ranked athletes by time during the season who entered the championships were given a BYE into the Semi-Finals. The first round was held on Monday, August 6. The Semi-Finals were held the day after, and the Final just over two hours after that.

Results

Round 1
First 2 in each heat (Q) and the next fastest 5 (q) advance to the Semifinals. 7 fastest entrants awarded bye to Semifinals.

Wind:Heat 1: -0.2 m/s, Heat 2: +0.1 m/s, Heat 3: +0.2 m/s, Heat 4: -0.3 m/s, Heat 5: +0.4 m/s

Semifinals

First 2 (Q) and next 2 fastest (q) qualify for the final.

Wind:Heat 1: +0.4 m/s, Heat 2: +0.6 m/s, Heat 3: +0.2 m/s

*Athletes who received a bye to the semifinals

Final
Wind: 0.0 m/s

References
100m Men European Athletic Association

100 M
100 metres at the European Athletics Championships